Iridomyrmex suchieri is a species of ant in the genus Iridomyrmex. Described by Forel in 1907, the species is endemic to Australia, but has also been recorded from New Zealand.

References

Iridomyrmex
Hymenoptera of Australia
Insects described in 1907

Hymenoptera of New Zealand
Ants of New Zealand